Squel Sauane Stein (born 7 September 1991) is a Brazilian racing cyclist who represents Brazil in BMX. She was selected to represent Brazil at the 2012 Summer Olympics in the women's BMX event in which she received a serious injury to her arm resulting in her elimination from the event.

Notes

References

External links
 
 
 
 
 

1991 births
Living people
BMX riders
Brazilian female cyclists
Brazilian BMX riders
Olympic cyclists of Brazil
Cyclists at the 2012 Summer Olympics